Colibași may refer to several places in Romania:

Colibași, Giurgiu, a commune in Giurgiu County
Colibași, a village in Mioveni Town, Argeș County, and Mioveni itself, called Colibași until 1996
Colibași, a village in Râmnicelu Commune, Buzău County
Colibași, a village in Iedera Commune, Dâmbovița County
Colibași, a village in Scoarța Commune, Gorj County
Colibași, a village in Malovăț Commune, Mehedinți County
Colibași, a village in Strejești Commune, Olt County

and in Moldova:

Colibași, Cahul, a commune in Cahul district